Lake Kathryn may refer to:

 Lake Kathryn, Florida, a census-designated place in Lake County, Florida, US
 Lake Kathryn (Idaho), an alpine lake in Custer County, Idaho, US

See also
 Lake Katherine, a lake in New Mexico, US
 Lake Katharine State Nature Preserve, a nature preserve in Jackson County, Ohio, US
 Lake Catherine (disambiguation)
 Kathryn (disambiguation)